Matthew "Matt" James Cook (born 17 May 1978) is a Jersey-born Spanish international rugby union player. He plays as a Flanker or a Number 8. Cook currently plays for Tunbridge Wells RFC and the Spain national rugby union team.

Personal life 
Born in Saint Helier, Cook was educated at De La Salle College.

Career 
Cook started to play rugby at the age of 6 for Jersey. In 1998 he moved from Jersey to England and signed for Bedford Blues where he made his debut in the English Premiership on his 21st birthday against Richmond RFC. In that match he scored two tries. This was his only senior game for Bedford Blues. He was later released by Bedford Blues and attempted to find another Premiership club. In 2003, he was signed by Blaydon RFC. When he was unable to join another Premiership club, he retired from rugby.

In 2005, Cook moved to Villajoyosa, Spain and came out of retirement to sign for CR La Vila. In 2009, he was selected to play for Olympus Rugby XV Madrid in the European Challenge Cup. In 2013, Cook played for English amateur side, Tunbridge Wells RFC.

International career 
In 2009, Cook was invited by the Spanish national team to join them in training camps. In 2010, Cook qualified to play for Spain under residency rules as he had lived in Spain for 5 years. He made his debut in a 2011 Rugby World Cup qualifier against Russia national rugby union team at Estadio Nacional Complutense in Madrid. This made him the second Jersey born player to win an international cap after Matt Banahan was called up to the England national rugby union team.

References 

Jersey rugby union players
Living people
Rugby union number eights
Rugby union flankers
Spanish rugby union players
Spain international rugby union players
1978 births
Bedford Blues players
People educated at De La Salle College, Jersey
Alumni of the University of Northampton